Noregs vaapen is the fifth full-length album, and 12th release from Norwegian black metal band Taake.

Track listing
All lyrics and music by Hoest, except where noted.  Some English title translations are listed.

Personnel

Taake
Hoest: Vocals, Guitars, Bass, Drums

Additional Personnel
Bjoernar E. Nilsen: Mellotron on tracks 1 & 5; additional vocals on track 6
Nocturno Culto: Vocals on track 1
Attila: Vocals on track 3
Demonaz: Vocals on track 4
V'gandr: Vocals on track 4
Skaggg: Vocals on track 5
Lava: Guitar Solo on track 3
Aindiachai: First guitar solo on track 4
Gjermund Fredheim: Second guitar solo on track 4, guitar solo on track 5, first guitar solo on track 7, banjo on track 5, mandolin on track 6
Thurzur: Second guitar solo on track 7, sound effects on track 5

References

Taake albums
2011 albums
Candlelight Records albums